The shortnose whiting, Sillago arabica, is a recently described and poorly known species of inshore marine fish of the smelt whiting family Sillaginidae that inhabits only the Persian Gulf. S. arabica is similar in morphology to other sillaginids, although has a distinctive shortened snout which gives the species its common name. This species is of no current interest to local fisheries, although beach seines may take minor amounts of this species.

Taxonomy and naming
The shortnose whiting belongs to the genus Sillago, a subdivision of the smelt whiting family Sillaginidae. The Sillaginidae are in the suborder Percoidei, a division of the Perciformes.

The species was identified and named Sillago arabica by  Roland McKay and L.J. McCarthy in 1989, after examining the holotype which was initially collected in Tanajib Bay in the Persian Gulf during 1982.
The authors also termed the common name 'shortnose whiting' for the species, as its uniquely short snout is a key identifying feature in the field.

Description
The shortnose whiting shares the same basic profile as most of the genus Sillago, possessing an elongate, slightly compressed body tapering toward the terminal mouth. The profile of the species is slightly leaner than most of its close relatives, which may be one initial key to field identification. More definitive diagnostic features include the spine and ray count of the dorsal and anal fins as well as the morphology of the swim bladder. The first dorsal fin consists of 12 or 13 spines, while the second dorsal fin has one spine and 22 to 24 soft rays posterior to the spine.  The anal fin is similar to the second dorsal fin with 2 spines followed by 22 to 24 soft rays. The species has 75 to 80 lateral line scales and a total of 38 to 40 vertebrae, also diagnostic features. The species is one of the smaller whitings, growing only to a maximum length of 15 cm overall. The swim bladder of S. arabica has no anterior extensions and a single posterior extension. The anterior margin of the organ is slightly rounded, while a duct like tubular process extends from the ventral surface to the urogenital opening.

The species has pale sandy brown colour overall, with a slightly paler belly and slightly darker upper operculum. There are no dark blotches present on the side of the fish, while the first and second dorsal fins and caudal fin are dusted with black.

Distribution and habitat
The shortnose whiting is entirely restricted to the Persian Gulf, where it inhabits the shallow coastal waters out to a depth of 5m. The species is often caught in seine nets along beaches in the Persian Gulf, although no fishery exists for the species. As mentioned previously, the species has had very little data collected on it, with the initial description by McKay and McCarthy in 1989 the only major study on the species.

References

External links
Shortnose whiting at Fishbase

Sillaginidae
Taxa named by Roland J. McKay
Taxa named by Linda J. McCarthy
Fish described in 1989